Civitas Foundation for Civil Society is a NGO in Romania which aims to stimulate the local and regional development.

History 

Civitas Foundation was founded in October 1992. The main reasons for its founding were the need to enhance the local government capacity and to stimulate the citizen’s involvement in decision making and local governance. The foundation carries on activities in Transylvania, but carries on projects on national and international level (South East Europe) too.

Programs and projects 

The programs and projects carried on by the foundation can be classified in four major domains which are in concordance with the strategically principles.
  Rural development:
 Local development officer
 Integrated local development
  Human resources development:
 SEDAP
 Continuous adult training
 Elaboration of occupational standard : Programs director
  Civil society development:
Citizens participation 
 Advice and information:
 Citizens Advice Bureau (BCC Odorheiu Secuiesc)
 Basic knowledge for the NGO sector
 How to access ESF funds
Social partnership:
 Interethnic Magazine
  Developing local public administration capacity:
 SEDAP
 Efficient local public administration
 Local policies and EU integration
 Local budget policies

Services 

The services provided by the foundation are structured in three categories:
 Administration of a resource center to sustain the local and regional development
 Training is offered in the following areas:
 Public management (operational and strategic management),
 Human resources management,
 Institutional communication,
 Project management,
 Local and regional development,
 Financial management in local public administration.
 Consulting is offered in the following fields:
 Elaboration of local and regional development strategies,
 Elaboration of projects proposed for financing,
 Human resources management, staff policies,
 Financial management and local finances,
 Legal consulting in administrative law matters,
 Institutional communication,
 Elaboration of promotion materials.

Target groups 

The beneficiaries of the services offered by Civitas:
 Local government institutions,
 Non-governmental organizations (NGOs),
 Private enterprises,
 Other institutions involved in the local development process.

Strategic partners 

 Hungarian Academy for Sciences
 Transylvania Highway Company
 University Babes-Bolyai, Faculty of Political, Administrative and Communication Sciences
 Public Policy Center
 Regional Training center - Békéscsaba, Hungary
 LIA Deutschland
 Microsoft România
 Peace Corps, USA
 Center of Rural Assistance
 Local Councils from Alba and Cluj
 Harvest Hope Pro Homorod
 Foundation for Hungarian NGO's in Transylvania

Member in networks 

Civitas Foundation is member in the followings networks:
 RuralNet
 Citizens’ Pact for SEE
 Pannonforrás
 Local Social Consortium – Odorheiu Secuiesc
 Citizens Advice Bureau

Publications 
 Youth Issues and Challenges
 Social Development Strategy of Odorheiu Secuiesc
 Local Development Officer - policy paper
 Strengthening the Capacity of Local Public Administration to Adopt and Implement Development Policies

See also
Civitas (disambiguation)

References

External links
Civitas Foundation for Civil Society (official site)
Fundatia Civitas Pentru Societatea Civila ( Fundatia Civitas ) (Online Donations for Romanian NGOs)
CIVITAS Foundation for Civil Society - Publications (CIVITAS) (MORESS - Mapping of Research in European Social Sciences and Humanities)

Non-profit organizations based in Romania
Civil society